Scrap Iron may refer to:

 Scrap, the recycling of metals including iron
 Scrap-Iron, a fictional character in the G.I. Joe universe
 Scrap Iron (Transformers), a fictional character from Transformers: Cybertron
 Phil Garner, a baseball player nicknamed Scrap Iron
 Scrap Iron (film), a 1921 American film directed by and starring Charles Ray

See also
 Scrap Iron Flotilla